The National Institute on Drug Abuse (NIDA) is a United States federal government research institute whose mission is to "advance science on the causes and consequences of drug use and addiction and to apply that knowledge to improve individual and public health."

The institute has conducted an in-depth study of addiction according to its biological, behavioral and social components. It has also supported many treatments such as nicotine patches and gums, and performed research into AIDS and other drug-related diseases. Its monopoly on the supply of research-grade marijuana has proved controversial.

History
NIDA's roots can be traced back to 1935, when a research facility (named the Addiction Research Center in 1948) was established in Lexington, Kentucky as part of a USPHS hospital. The Drug Abuse Warning Network (DAWN) and National Household Survey on Drug Abuse (NHSDA) were created in 1972. In 1974 NIDA was established as part of the Alcohol, Drug Abuse, and Mental Health Administration and given authority over the DAWN and NHSDA programs. The Monitoring the Future Survey, which surveys high school seniors, was initiated in 1975; in 1991, it was expanded to include 8th and 10th graders.

In October 1992, NIDA became part of the National Institutes of Health (NIH), United States Department of Health and Human Services. At that time, responsibility for the DAWN and NHSDA programs were transferred to the Substance Abuse and Mental Health Services Administration (SAMHSA). NIDA is organized into divisions and offices, each of which is involved with programs of drug abuse research. Nora Volkow, MD, has been the director of NIDA since 2003.

According to NIH:

The physical/psychological addiction dichotomy is reflected in the Controlled Substances Act's criteria for drug scheduling. Placement in Schedule III, for instance, requires a finding that "abuse of the drug or other substance may lead to moderate or low physical dependence or high psychological dependence." The view espoused by former NIDA director Alan I. Leshner, which places more emphasis on the "compulsive, uncontrollable" aspect of addictive drug use than on physical withdrawal symptoms, explains NIDA's differing treatment of morphine and cannabis. Morphine is physically addictive, and users of heroin and other opiate-derived drugs become physically and psychologically dependent on the high from the opiates, which drives them to seek the drug and perform acts they might not normally engage in (like exchanging drugs for sex acts or sharing needles with another user) . In contrast, marijuana is not physically addictive, though some users do become psychologically dependent on the drug. Jon Gettman and other supporters of removal of cannabis from Schedule I of the Controlled Substances Act have questioned the legality of basing scheduling decisions on such considerations rather than on physical addiction and physical harm; Gettman stated, "If the federal government wants to keep marijuana in schedule 1, or if they believe that placing marijuana in schedule 2 is a viable policy, then we're going to cross-examine under oath and penalty of perjury every HHS official and scientist who claims that marijuana use is as dangerous as the use of cocaine or heroin." NIDA's viewpoint is supported by the fact that the CSA lists not only physical addictiveness but also "history and current pattern of abuse" and "scope, duration, and significance of abuse" among the factors to be considered in drug scheduling. Indeed, cannabis' retention in Schedule I has been partly due to findings in these areas by FDA, SAMHSA, and NIDA. The January 17, 2001 document Basis for the Recommendation for Maintaining Marijuana in Schedule I of the Controlled Substances Act specifically cites SAMHSA's National Household Survey on Drug Abuse, NIDA's Monitoring the Future survey, SAMHSA's Drug Abuse Warning Network, and NIDA's Community Epidemiology Work Group data.

NIDA has supported many treatments for drug addiction. NIDA-supported studies led to the use of nicotine patches and gums for nicotine addiction treatment. NIDA scientists also developed LAAM, which is used for heroin addiction treatment. Other treatments that were the subject of NIDA research include naltrexone and buprenorphine. NIDA states, "By conservative estimates, every $1 spent on drug addiction saves society $4 to $7 in criminal justice and health care costs", which points to the need for spending funds on effective prevention and treatment programs based on evidence, rather than criminal sanctions that do not impact drug use.

NIDA has also conducted research into diseases associated with drug use, such as AIDS and Hepatitis. NIDA views drug treatment as a means of modifying risky behavior such as unprotected sex and sharing needles. NIDA has also funded studies dealing with harm reduction. A NIDA-supported study on pregnant drug users noted, "professionals in research and treatment must learn to settle for less because insisting on total abstinence may exacerbate the problem." This study was conducted by Marsha Rosenbaum of the Lindesmith Center, an organization that has been critical of federal drug policies.

In the 1990s, NIDA funded research by John W. Huffman that was focused on making a drug to target endocannabinoid receptors in the body; this resulted in the discovery of a variety of substances that are now being sold as Spice, K2, etc.

In 2006, NIDA received an annual budget of $1.01 billion. The U.S. government says NIDA funds more than 85 percent of the world's research about the health aspects of drug abuse and addiction.

Past Directors
Past Directors from 1973 - present

Publications
NIDA Notes is a bimonthly newsletter that has been published since 1985. Its scope covers drug abuse research in the areas of treatment and prevention, epidemiology, neuroscience, behavioral science, health services, and AIDS. NIDA-supported studies are also published in other journals. NIDA publishes educational materials as well which aim to provide pertinent facts to teenagers who will be making drug use decisions and to parents. This literature has sometimes been used by legalization advocates to advance their points, an example being NIDA's admittal that "many young people who use marijuana do not go on to use other drugs."

Controversial research
Drug abuse, in addition to being an area of scientific research, is also a major subject of public policy debate. Accordingly, elected officials have sometimes attempted to shape the debate by introducing legislation in reference to NIDA research. In 2004, Congressman Mark Souder introduced the Safe and Effective Drug Act, calling for a "meta-analysis of existing medical marijuana data." It was criticized for being limited to smoked cannabis (rather than vaporizers and other methods of ingestion) and not requiring any new research. In some cases, NIDA has held its ground when its more moderate stances were questioned by legislators favoring a hard-line approach. On April 27, 2004, Souder sent NIH Director Elias A. Zerhouni a letter criticizing needle exchange programs for causing increases in infection rates. The Harm Reduction Coalition responded with its concerns, and NIDA Director Nora Volkow wrote a letter stating:

DAWN, or the Drug Abuse Warning Network, is a program to collect statistics on the frequency of emergency department mentions of use of different types of drugs. This information is widely cited by drug policy officials, who have sometimes confused drug-related episodes—emergency department visits induced by drugs—with drug mentions.  The Wisconsin Department of Justice claimed, "In Wisconsin, marijuana overdose visits in emergency rooms equal to heroin or morphine [sic], twice as common as Valium." Common Sense for Drug Policy called this as a distortion, noting, "The federal DAWN report itself notes that reports of marijuana do not mean people are going to the hospital for a marijuana overdose, it only means that people going to the hospital for a drug overdose mention marijuana as a drug they use."

The National Survey on Drug Use and Health is an annual study of American drug use patterns. According to NIDA, "The data collection method is in–person interviews conducted with a sample of individuals at their place of residence. ACASI provides a highly private and confidential means of responding to questions to increase the level of honest reporting of illicit drug use and other sensitive behavior." Sixty-eight thousand people were interviewed in 2003, with a weighted response rate for interviewing of 73 percent.  Like DAWN, the Survey often draws criticism because of how the data is used by drug policy officials.  Rob Kampia of Marijuana Policy Project stated in a September 5, 2002 press release, 

NIDA literature and National Institute of Mental Health (NIMH) research frequently contradict each other.  For instance, in the 1980s and 1990s, NIMH researchers found that dopamine plays only a marginal role in marijuana's psychoactive effects.  Years later, however, NIDA educational materials continued to warn of the danger of dopamine-related marijuana addiction.  NIDA appears to be backing off of these dopamine claims, adding disclaimers to its teaching packets that the interaction of THC with the reward system is not fully understood.

The NIDA also funded the research of John W. Huffman who first synthesized many novel cannabinoids. This compounds are now being sold all around the world as pure compounds or mixed with herbals known as spices. The fact that NIDA has allowed and paid for the synthesis of these new cannabinoids without recommending human consumption research is a topic of concern, especially since some of these JWH substances were recently put into Schedule I of the Controlled Substances Act via emergency legislation.

Medical marijuana monopoly

NIDA has inside the US a government granted monopoly on the production of medical marijuana for research purposes. In the past, the institute has refused to supply marijuana to researchers who had obtained all other necessary federal permits. Medical marijuana researchers and activists claim that NIDA, which is not supposed to be a regulatory organization, does not have the authority to effectively regulate who does and doesn't get to do research with medical marijuana. Jag Davies of the Multidisciplinary Association for Psychedelic Studies (MAPS) writes in MAPS Bulletin:

NIDA administers a contract with the University of Mississippi to grow the nation's only legal cannabis crop for medical and research purposes, including the Compassionate Investigational New Drug program.  A Fast Company article pointed out, "Based on the photographic evidence, NIDA's concoction of seeds, stems, and leaves more closely resembles dried cat brier than cannabis".
An article in Mother Jones describes their crop as "brown, stems-and-seeds-laden, low-potency pot—what's known on the streets as 'schwag'". United States federal law currently registers cannabis as a Schedule I drug.  Medical marijuana researchers typically prefer to use high-potency marijuana, but NIDA's National Advisory Council on Drug Abuse has been reluctant to provide cannabis with high THC levels, citing safety concerns:

Speaking before the National Advisory Council on Drug Abuse, Rob Kampia of the Marijuana Policy Project criticized NIDA for refusing to provide researcher Donald Abrams with marijuana for his studies, stating that "after nine months of delay, Leshner rejected Abrams' request for marijuana, on what we believe are political grounds that the FDA-approved protocol is inadequate."

In May 2006, the Boston Globe reported that:

Ricaurte's monkeys

NIDA has drawn criticism for continuing to provide funding to George Ricaurte, who in 2002 conducted a study that was widely touted as proving that MDMA (ecstasy) caused dopaminergic neurotoxicity in monkeys. His paper "Severe Dopaminergic Neurotoxicity in Primates After a Common Recreational Dose Regimen of MDMA ('Ecstasy')" in Science was later retracted after it became clear that the monkeys had in fact been injected not with MDMA, but with extremely high doses of methamphetamine. A FOIA request was subsequently filed by MAPS to find out more about the research and NIDA's involvement in it.

Effectiveness of anti-marijuana ad campaigns

In February 2005, Westat, a research company hired by NIDA and funded by The White House Office of National Drug Control Policy, reported on its five-year study of the government ad campaigns aimed at dissuading teens from using marijuana, campaigns that cost more than $1 billion between 1998 and 2004. The study found that the ads did not work: "greater exposure to the campaign was associated with weaker anti-drug norms and increases in the perceptions that others use marijuana."  NIDA leaders and the White House drug office did not release the Westat report for a year and a half.  NIDA dated Westat's report as "delivered" in June 2006. In fact, it was delivered in February 2005, according to the Government Accountability Office, the federal watchdog agency charged with reviewing the study.

Office of Inspector General (OIG) investigations of NIDA commercial partnerships
On the 26 October 2011, the OIG published its results from an audit of a contract between the National Institute on Drug Abuse (NIDA) and Charles River Laboratories, Inc., which read in part:

See also 
 William Pollin, second director of NIDA, from 1975–1985

References

External links

 
 National Institute on Drug Abuse: "NIDA for Teens".
 NIH Almanac, NIDA Timelines and organizational structure
 The National Survey on Drug Use and Health (NSDUH), NIDA
 Convention on Psychotropic Substances 1971, International Narcotics Control Board.
 Breen, Bill: Pipe Dream?: Rick Doblin has a prescription for fixing NIDA's ailing medical-marijuana program: establish an alternative, Issue 79, Feb. 2004.
 Drug War Distortions, Common Sense for Drug Policy.
 Kampia, Rob: Testimony at the September 19 Meeting of the National Advisory Council on Drug Abuse, 19 September 1995.
 MPP Responds to Release of 2001 National Household Survey on Drug Abuse, Marijuana Policy Project, 5 September 2002.
 Grim, Ryan: Federal Agency Cleans Up Its Own Wikipedia Entry
 Feds Mess with Wikipedia Entry, Again Blog entry about efforts by NIH staff to remove criticism of NIDA from this page

Drug Abuse
1974 establishments in Maryland
Government research
Medical research institutes in Maryland